Bradybaena is a genus of small, air-breathing land snails, or terrestrial molluscs in the family Bradybaenidae. 

Species of snail within this genus create and use love darts prior to mating.

Distribution
This genus occurs in eastern and southern Asia. The European species Fruticicola fruticum was previously in this genus.

Species 
 
 Bradybaena acustina (Möllendorff, 1899)
 Bradybaena bocageana (Crosse, 1864)
 Bradybaena bouryi (de Morgan, 1885)
 Bradybaena brevispira (H. Adams, 1870)
 Bradybaena carphochroa (Möllendorff, 1899)
 Bradybaena cestus (Benson, 1836)
 Bradybaena chrysomphala (Möllendorff, 1899)
 Bradybaena circulus (L. Pfeiffer, 1846)
 Bradybaena cochinchinensis (L. Pfeiffer, 1862)
 Bradybaena cremata (Heude, 1882)
 Bradybaena dectica (Mabille, 1888)
 Bradybaena diplodesma (Möllendorff, 1899)
 Bradybaena disculina Haas, 1933
 Bradybaena duplocingula (Möllendorff, 1899)
 Bradybaena eris (Möllendorff, 1899)
 Bradybaena fedtschenkoi (Martens, 1874)
 Bradybaena fortunei (L. Pfeiffer, 1850)
 Bradybaena franzhuberi Thach, 2021
 Bradybaena fuchsi (Gredler, 1878)
 Bradybaena galera (Heude, 1890)
 Bradybaena giovannalimae M. A. Lima & T. Cossignani, 2021
 Bradybaena graeseri (Mousson, 1887)
 Bradybaena halpozona (Möllendorff, 1899)
 Bradybaena huberi Thach, 2018
 Bradybaena hukudai Kuroda & Miyanaga, 1939
 Bradybaena impatiens (Heude, 1885)
 Bradybaena jiahei H.-F. Yang, Z.-Y. Fan, D.-D. Qiao & J. He, 2012
 Bradybaena jourdyi (Morlet, 1886)
 Bradybaena kiangsiensis (Martens, 1875)
 Bradybaena latilabris (Möllendorff, 1874)
 Bradybaena linjun M. Wu & Z. Chen, 2019
 Bradybaena magnaciana (Heude, 1882)
 Bradybaena micromphala (Möllendorff, 1899)
 Bradybaena paricincta (Martens, 1879)
 Bradybaena pellucida  Kuroda & Habe, 1953
 Bradybaena poecila (Möllendorff, 1899)
 Bradybaena pseudocampylaea (Möllendorff, 1899)
 Bradybaena qixiaensis M. Wu & Asami, 2017
 Bradybaena radicidola (Benson, 1848)
 Bradybaena sanboensis Kuroda & Miyanaga, 1939
 Bradybaena scalpturita (Benson, 1859)
 Bradybaena schanorum (Möllendorff, 1899)
 Bradybaena schrenckii (Middendorff, 1851)
 Bradybaena selskii (Gerstfeldt, 1859)
 Bradybaena sequiniana (Heude, 1885)
 Bradybaena similaris (Férussac, 1822)
 Bradybaena straminea (Heude, 1882)
 Bradybaena strauchiana (Möllendorff, 1899)
 Bradybaena strictotaenia (Möllendorff, 1899)
 Bradybaena tenuitesta (Möllendorff, 1899)
 Bradybaena tourannensis (Souleyet, 1852)
 Bradybaena vagoina (Gredler, 1887)
 Bradybaena virgo (Pilsbry, 1927)
 Bradybaena wangkai X.-L. Sun, Z.-H. Zeng & J. He, 2017

Species brought into synonymy
 Bradybaena alaica Kuznetsov, 1998: synonym of Fruticicola alaica (Kuznetsov, 1998) (original combination)
 Bradybaena boevi Uvalieva, 1967: synonym of Fruticicola boevi (Uvalieva, 1967) (original combination)
 Bradybaena hirsuta Matiokon, 1966: synonym of Ponsadenia hirsuta (Matiokin, 1966) (original combination)
 Bradybaena changchunensis  X.-L. Sun, Z.-H. Zeng & J. He, 2017 : synonym of Bradybaena virgo (Pilsbry, 1927)
 Bradybaena thakkholensis Schileyko & Kuznetsov, 1998: accepted as Bradybaena H. Beck, 1837

References

 Schileyko, A. A. & Kuznetsov, A. G. (1998). Land snails of the genus Landouria Godwin-Austen, 1918 and some other Bradybaenidae of Nepal (Gastropoda, Pulmonata). Ruthenica. 8(1): 43-54
 Thach N.N., 2018 New shells of South Asia. Seashells-Landsnails-Freshwater Shells. 3 New Genera, 132 New Species & Subspecies, p. 173 pp
 Zhang, G. (2019). Three new synonyms among Chinese camaenid snails (Gastropoda: Eupulmonata: Camaenidae). Folia Malacologica 27(1): 75-77

External links
 Taxonomy
 Beck, H. (1837). Index molluscorum praesentis aevi musei principis augustissimi Christiani Frederici. 1-124. Hafniae (Copenhagen)

Bradybaenidae
Gastropod genera